Claude François Dupré or Claude François Duprès (3 October 1755 – 21 July 1808) was a French general. 

Born in Fort-Louis, Bas-Rhin, he first joined up in 1776 and served in the armies of the French Revolution and First French Empire. He was killed at Battle of Bailén in Bailén, Andalucia.

1755 births
1808 deaths
People from Bas-Rhin
Barons of the First French Empire
French military personnel of the French Revolutionary Wars
French commanders of the Napoleonic Wars
French military personnel killed in the Napoleonic Wars
Commandeurs of the Légion d'honneur